is a Japanese professional baseball catcher for the Chiba Lotte Marines in Japan's Nippon Professional Baseball.

External links

NPB statistics

1991 births
Living people
Japanese baseball players
Nippon Professional Baseball catchers
Chiba Lotte Marines players
People from Nagareyama
Baseball people from Chiba Prefecture